Miroslav Čopjak (14 September 1963 – 2021) was a Czech football manager.

Managerial career
During his  managerial career, he managed the following clubs: Lukullus Świt Nowy Dwór Mazowiecki, Odra Opole, FK Třinec, Zagłębie Sosnowiec, Naprzód Zawada, Ruch Wysokie Mazowieckie, Resovia, Odra Wodzisław Śląski, Bodva Moldava nad Bodvou, SK Dětmarovice, Lokomotiva Petrovice, Nadwiślan Góra and Piast Cieszyn.

On 16 May 2003, he became the coach of Lukullus Świt Nowy Dwór Mazowiecki, with whom, for the first time in the history of the club, he was promoted to the Ekstraklasa through play-offs against Szczakowianka Jaworzno. He stayed there until 2 November 2003, as he was dismissed after 10 games by club officials due to poor performance. On 26 May 2005, he was appointed coach of the Odra Opole with which in the 2005/2006 season he took 2nd place in the 3rd group of the 3rd league and then he was promoted to the 2nd league after the play-offs against Radomiak Radom. He was released from Odra Opole on 19 November 2006, after poor results in the autumn round.

From July 2021 until his death in December 2021, he was a manager of Piast Cieszyn in the Polish regional league.

Death 
He died in December 2021 at the age of 58. On 23 December 2021, he was buried at the cemetery in Karviná, Czech Republic.

References

1963 births
2021 deaths
Czech football managers
FK Fotbal Třinec managers
Odra Opole managers
Zagłębie Sosnowiec managers
Odra Wodzisław Śląski managers
Czech expatriate football managers
Expatriate football managers in Poland
Czech expatriate sportspeople in Poland
Expatriate football managers in Slovakia
Czech expatriate sportspeople in Slovakia
People from Klatovy
Date of death unknown
Place of death unknown
Sportspeople from the Plzeň Region